Old River is an unincorporated community in Kern County, California.

The settlement was founded in the 1870s and named from the old Kern River bed.

References

Unincorporated communities in Kern County, California
Populated places established in the 1870s
Unincorporated communities in California

Census-designated places in Kern County, California
WikiProject Cities articles needing attention